North Carolina Highway 171 (NC 171) is a primary state highway in the U.S. state of North Carolina. It utilized as a connector route running from US 17 in Old Ford between Washington and Williamston to US 64 Business in Jamesville.

Route description
Starting from US 17, in Old Ford, this two-lane rural highway travels through the farmland of Beaufort and Martin Counties, ending in downtown Jamesville at US 64 Business.

History
Established as a new primary routing in 1936 and has not changed since. However, it had existed previously in the late 1920s to late 1934 from Lenoir to Edgemont; it was replaced by NC 90.

Junction list

References

External links

 NCRoads.com: N.C. 171

171
Transportation in Beaufort County, North Carolina
Transportation in Martin County, North Carolina